Roberto Alcântara Ballesteros (born 25 July 1977), known simply as Roberto, is a Brazilian former footballer who played as a striker.
 
He spent the vast majority of his professional career in Portugal, representing four clubs and amassing Primeira Liga totals of 83 matches and 19 goals over four seasons.

Club career
Born in Osasco, São Paulo, Roberto played mainly for Volta Redonda Futebol Clube in his country, also being loaned twice during his contract. In February 2003, he moved to Portugal and joined F.C. Penafiel, scoring 20 second division goals in his first full season, which ended in Primeira Liga promotion. He netted only 13 the following two combined, however, with the team being relegated in 2006.

Roberto then returned to the Portuguese second level, with Leixões SC, scoring 17 goals in 30 games in his first year en route to another promotion. After an average 2007–08, he could only appear in three matches the following campaign as the Matosinhos side finished in sixth position, mainly due to injury.

In the summer of 2009, aged 32, Roberto returned to the second tier as he signed for C.D. Feirense. He scored nine league goals in his second season, being an essential attacking player as the club returned to the top flight after an absence of 23 years.

Roberto joined F.C. Arouca of the second division on 2 August 2011.

References

External links

1977 births
Living people
People from Osasco
Brazilian footballers
Association football forwards
Campeonato Brasileiro Série B players
Volta Redonda FC players
Esporte Clube Juventude players
Vila Nova Futebol Clube players
Primeira Liga players
Liga Portugal 2 players
F.C. Penafiel players
Leixões S.C. players
C.D. Feirense players
F.C. Arouca players
Brazilian expatriate footballers
Expatriate footballers in Portugal
Brazilian expatriate sportspeople in Portugal
Footballers from São Paulo (state)